Husted was a settlement on the Denver and Rio Grande Railroad and located thirteen miles north of Colorado Springs at  . Residents were involved in ranching and lumber businesses. In 1878, a railroad post office was moved from Southwater to Husted. The post office closed in 1920.

See also
 List of ghost towns in Colorado

References

Former populated places in El Paso County, Colorado
Former populated places in Colorado